The gens Axia, also spelled Axsia, was a plebeian family at Rome during the final century of the Republic and the beginning of the Empire.  The gens does not appear to have been particularly large or important, although at least some of the family were reasonably wealthy.

Branches and cognomina
None of the Axii mentioned in history bear a surname; the only cognomen found in inscriptions is Naso, originally referring to someone with a prominent nose.

Members

 Quintus Axius M. f., a senator in 73 BC.  He was a wealthy man from Reate, and friend of both Cicero and Varro, who made him a protagonist of his De Re Rustica.  His grand villa at Colli sul Velino can be seen today.
 Marcus Gallius Axianus, son of Cicero and Varro's friend who was adopted into the Gallia gens.
 Lucius Axius L. f. Naso, triumvir monetalis in 71 BC, probably to be identified with the eques mentioned by Varro, and a banker named in an inscription.
 Lucius Axius L. f. (L. n.) Naso, proconsul in Cyprus in AD 29.

See also
 List of Roman gentes

References

Bibliography

 Marcus Terentius Varro, Rerum Rusticarum (Rural Matters).
 Marcus Tullius Cicero, Epistulae ad Atticum.
 Gaius Suetonius Tranquillus, De Vita Caesarum (Lives of the Caesars, or The Twelve Caesars).
 Aulus Gellius, Noctes Atticae (Attic Nights).
 Joseph Hilarius Eckhel, Doctrina Numorum Veterum (The Study of Ancient Coins, 1792–1798).
 Dictionary of Greek and Roman Biography and Mythology, William Smith, ed., Little, Brown and Company, Boston (1849).
 Theodor Mommsen et alii, Corpus Inscriptionum Latinarum (The Body of Latin Inscriptions, abbreviated CIL), Berlin-Brandenburgische Akademie der Wissenschaften (1853–present).
 Wilhelm Dittenberger, Sylloge Inscriptionum Graecarum (Collection of Greek Inscriptions, abbreviated SIG), Leipzig (1883); Orientis Graeci Inscriptiones Selectae (Select Inscriptions from the Greek East, abbreviated OGIS), Leipzig (1905).
 George Davis Chase, "The Origin of Roman Praenomina", in Harvard Studies in Classical Philology, vol. VIII, pp. 103–184 (1897).
 T. Robert S. Broughton, The Magistrates of the Roman Republic, American Philological Association (1952–1986).
 Michael Crawford, Roman Republican Coinage, Cambridge University Press (1974, 2001).
 Robert C. Knapp, "L. Axius Naso and Pro Legato", in Phoenix, vol. 35, pp. 134–141 (1981). 

Roman gentes